The Sport of Kings is the eighth studio album by the Canadian hard rock band Triumph, released in 1986. It was recorded at the band's home studio of Metalworks Studios from May to August 1986. A song from the album, "Somebody's Out There", was the band's biggest hit, reaching number 27 on the Billboard Hot 100 over a 15-week stay in the charts and hitting number 84 in the Canadian pop charts.

History
This is the second-to-last studio album with the band's guitarist and co-lead vocalist Rik Emmett, and it clearly represents the difficulties the band was experiencing at the time. Mike Levine played no keyboards on the album; three outside keyboard players were hired to create the keyboard sounds of the album, although Rik Emmett experiments with two high-end sampler systems, the Synclavier 9600 Workstation and the Fairlight CMI Series III, according to Keyboard magazine's July 1986 issue. Emmett sings lead vocals on six of the album's ten songs; four songs were sung by Gil Moore, and one track was sung as a duet by the two vocalists. The recording of The Sport of Kings was marred by tension between Triumph and their label MCA. Emmett has since expressed his dislike for much of the album. Adding to the tension was Emmett's request that the recording be done at Estudio L2K in Majorca, Spain. Only three of this album's songs have ever been performed live by Triumph, and one track was performed live by Emmett during his first three solo tours.

Track listing

Personnel
Band members
 Rik Emmett – lead and rhythm guitars, lead and backing vocals, Fairlight CMI, Synclavier programming
 Gil Moore – drums, percussion, lead and backing vocals
 Mike Levine – bass guitar, keyboards, synthesizers, backing vocals

Additional musicians
 Lou Pomanti, Michael Boddicker, Scott Humphrey – synthesizer, synthesizer programming, keyboards
 Johnny Rutledge, David Blamires, Neil Donell – backing vocals

Production
 Mike Clink – producer, engineer
 Noel Golden, Dave Runstedler, Toby Wright, Allen Abrahamson, Ernie Torno – assistant engineers
 Bob Ludwig – mastering
 Thom Trumbo – executive producer
 Tommy Steele – design
 Adamoff – cover art concept
 Brett Zilahi – remastering on 2005 re–issue
 Yoshiro Kuzumaki – mastering
 Harry Witz – engineer, sound advisor

Charts

Certifications

References

External links
The Sport of Kings entry at official Triumph home page

1986 albums
Triumph (band) albums
MCA Records albums
Albums produced by Mike Clink
Albums recorded at Metalworks Studios